Jeremiah Chaplin (January 2, 1776 – May 7, 1841) was a Reformed Baptist theologian who served as the first president of Colby College (then called the Waterville College) in Maine.

Chaplin was born in Rowley, Massachusetts (now Georgetown, Massachusetts) in 1776 to a Baptist family. He attended Brown University, a school with an historical Baptist affiliation, graduating in 1799 with a Bachelor of Arts. Chaplin spent a year at Brown as a tutor and pursued additional theological study to become a minister. To this end, he studied under Thomas Baldwin of the Second Baptist Church in Boston.

In 1802 he became minister of the Baptist church in Danvers, Massachusetts. Chaplin remained in Danvers through 1817 with the exception of a 1804 stint at the First Baptist Church in the City of New York.

College left his pastorate in Danvers in 1817 to become president of the new Waterville College (later Colby College) at which he served until 1833. Chaplin first met Gardner Colby during this period while Colby was still a child, and Chaplin assisted Colby's family after Colby's father died. 

During the remainder of his life, Chaplin preached in Rowley, Massachusetts and Willington, Connecticut, and then moved to Hamilton, New York where he died in 1841. Chaplin held to a Calvinist Baptist theology throughout his life.

Published works

References

1776 births
1841 deaths
Colby College faculty
Presidents of Colby College
Brown University alumni
People from Waterville, Maine
University and college founders
19th-century Baptist ministers from the United States
People from Georgetown, Massachusetts
People from Hamilton, New York
People of colonial Massachusetts
Baptists from New York (state)